Leslie Sands (19 May 1921 – 9 May 2001) was a British actor and writer of TV and film. Born in Bradford, Yorkshire, Sands usually specialized in dour types in authority, often policemen.
He was married to Pauline Williams  (1950 - 9 May 2001) (his death).

According to the Guardian obituary, 'From school in Bradford, he went to Leeds University to read English, [and] caught the acting bug in student productions'
In 1941, Sands had his theatrical debut at the Lyceum Theatre in Sheffield. He was a member of the Royal Shakespeare Company and appeared in several Royal National Theatre productions, among others.

His many TV roles included the lead character role of Cluff, The Saint, The Avengers, Z-Cars (where he also wrote several episodes), The Main Chance, Department S, Juliet Bravo, The Two Ronnies, Murder Most English, Boon and  Stay Lucky.

The first TV adaptation of Johnny Speight’s If There Weren't Any Blacks You'd Have To Invent Them screened in 1968 (b&w) starred Sands in the role of the blind man. The revised colour version in 1974 starred Leonard Rossiter in the same role. He also appears with Leonard Rossiter in The Fall & Rise of Reginald Perrin (series 3, episode 3), The Seven Dials Mystery (1981).

His film roles included appearances in The Deadly Affair (1966), Danger Route (1967), One More Time (1970), The Ragman's Daughter (1972), Escape from the Dark (1976) and Bloodline (1979).

Leslie's TV writing credits include Van Der Valk and A Family at War as well as Z-Cars.

Leslie Sands also wrote a number of plays, the most notable being Intent to Murder’’. Others include ‘’Stay Single & Live Forever, Intent To Murder, Therese Raquin,Good Old Summertime:A Final Fling At The Seaside, Sam Up In The World, Cat’s Cradle, The Conscience Of Sergeant Cluff & Something To Hide. 
His play, Deadlock, was adapted into the movie, Another Man’s Poison, starring Bette Davis and Gary Merrill. 

His grandson is actor Devin Stanfield, known for his leading role in cult TV series The Box of Delights'' (1984), and guest star in Chocky (1984).

Filmography

References

External links

English male television actors
English television writers
1921 births
2001 deaths
Male actors from Bradford
British male television writers
20th-century English screenwriters